Eric Smith may refer to:

Sports
Eric Smith (safety) (born 1983), American former football player and assistant coach
Eric Smith (offensive lineman) (born 1995), American football offensive tackle
Eric Smith (wide receiver) (born 1971), American football wide receiver
Eric Smith (Scottish footballer) (1934–1991), Scottish international footballer who played for Celtic and Leeds United
Eric Smith (Swedish footballer) (born 1997), Swedish football midfielder
Eric Smith (canoeist) (born 1964), Canadian Olympic sprint canoeist

Politics
Eric Smith (British politician) (1908–1951), British Conservative politician, MP, 1950–1951
Eric B. Smith (born 1942), American politician in Florida
Eric J. Smith (Michigan politician), prosecuting attorney of Macomb County, Michigan
Eric Smith (Kansas politician), member of the Kansas House of Representatives

Other
Eric Smith (artist) (1919–2017), Australian artist
Eric Smith (British Army officer) (1923–1998), British Army officer and military historian
Eric Smith (general) (fl. 1980s–2020s), United States Marine Corps general
Eric Smith (sportscaster) (born 1975), Canadian basketball analyst and Toronto Raptors radio sportscaster
Eric Smith (murderer) (born 1980), American murderer, convicted of killing a 4-year-old boy when he was 13 years old
Eric J. Smith (educator) (fl. 1970s–2010s), American educator in Florida
Eric Ledell Smith (1949–2008), American historian and author

See also
Erik Smith (1931–2004), German-born British music producer
Eric Smyth, Northern Irish politician
Eric Dorman-Smith (1895–1969), British Army soldier